The New York Volunteers, also known as the New York Companies and 1st Dutchess County Company, was a British Loyalist Provincial regiment, which served with the British Army, during American Revolutionary War.   Eventually, the New York Volunteers became the 3rd American Regiment, after being place on American establishment.

Regiment formed
The "New York Volunteers" were raised in Halifax, Province of Nova Scotia, in January, 1776.  Two companies, in the 1776 New York Campaign. The Volunteers participated in the 1777 Battle of Forts Clinton and Montgomery.  In October, 1778 they were sent to East Florida and were present, at the 1779 capture of Savannah and the 1780 Charleston. The Volunteers were at the 1780 Battle of Camden and the 1781 Hobkirk's Hill.

On May 2, 1779 New York Volunteers were placed on the American Establishment, as the 3rd American Regiment. A detachment of the regiment served, under Charles Grey in the defence of Plymouth, when their transport ship was blown across the Atlantic, after encountering foul weather, while sailing down the North American coastline. It was disbanded in Canada in 1783.

References

 Nelson, Paul David. Sir Charles Grey, First Earl Grey: Royal Soldier, Family Patriarch. Associated University Presses, 1996.

Loyalist military units in the American Revolution